Shareif Ziyadat (born September 23, 1980) is a celebrity photographer and artist. His interest in creative arts lead him to pursue a career in photography and graphic imagery. Shareif later graduated with a degree from the School of Visual Arts located in New York City and is the recipient of numerous advertising industry awards including the prestigious Clio, ADNY Awards, Graphics and recognition from the Art Directors Club.

Photographic career 
Shareif Ziyadat created Shareif Ziyadat Productions, an art production company. The company is known for shooting editorials, creating album packaging, and developing global advertising campaigns.

Notable clients 
Shareif has a client base that includes individual celebrities, beverages, record labels, fashion and automobiles. He has knowledge and experience working for spirit brands such as Hennessy, Hennessy Black, Stoli, Bacardi, Grey Goose and P. Diddy's Ciroc. He has also worked for such brands/campaigns as Rocawear, Cherry Coke ads for Jay-Z, GMC campaign with Mary J. Blige and Lexus with Alicia Keys. He also photographed and art directed campaigns for Russell Simmons Argyle Culture, Degree ad with Ashley Tisdale and an ABC special with Britney Spears. Shareif is the personal photographer for P Diddy, 50 Cent and Jay-Z.

Shareif Ziyadat Productions clients include: 
50 Cent
P. Diddy
Black Eyed Peas
Wyclef Jean
Kevin Durant
Swizz Beatz
Alicia Keys
Stephon Marbury's clothing line Starbury
Bad Boy Records
G-Unit
Interscope Records
Atlantic Records

Shareif has been featured as a subject himself in the 2010 Akademiks ad, MTV, VH1 and Bravo. His work has been published worldwide through many mainstream magazines. Shareif also is contracted by cYclops prod, which is owned by Albert Watson and Mike Jurkavac and at Shelter as a Creative Director/Consultant.

References 

1980 births
Living people
American photographers